Katuba is a constituency of the National Assembly of Zambia. It covers the rural area to the north-west of Lusaka in the Chibombo District of Central Province.

List of MPs

Election results

2001

2019

References

Constituencies of the National Assembly of Zambia
Constituencies established in 1973
1973 establishments in Zambia